Hijona in Spanish or Ixona in Basque is a hamlet and council located in the municipality of Elburgo/Burgelu, in Álava province, Basque Country, Spain. As of 2020, it has a population of 46.

Geography 
Hijona is located 16km east-southeast of Vitoria-Gasteiz.

References

Populated places in Álava